Xu Yifan and Zheng Saisai were the defending champions, but both players chose to participate in Madrid instead.

The top seeds Wang Yafan and Zhang Kailin won the title, defeating second seeds Varatchaya Wongteanchai and Yang Zhaoxuan in the final, 6–7(3–7), 7–6(7–2), [10–1].

Seeds

Draw

References 
 Draw

Kunming Open - Doubles